The following radio stations broadcast on FM frequency 96.1 MHz:

Argentina
 Pop Radio in Rosario, Santa Fe
 Radio María in Colón, Buenos Aires
 Radio María in Corrientes
 Radio María in Esquina, Corrientes
 Radio María in Crespo, Entre Ríos
 Radio María in Gualeguaychu, Entre Ríos

Australia
 2ONE in Sydney, New South Wales and Katoomba, New South Wales
 4NNN in Sunshine Coast, Queensland
 5SEF in Mount Gambier, South Australia
 ABC Classic FM in Shepparton, Victoria
 6NOW in Perth, Western Australia

Belize
Ak'Kutan Radio at Blue Creek
Aurelio Sho-Community Radio Specialist
Blue Creek Village 
Toledo District, Belize
Founder of first Maya Community based Radio- Ak' Kutan Radio.

Canada (Channel 241)
 CBCJ-FM in Timmins, Ontario
 CBCN-FM in North Bay, Ontario
 CBCT-FM in Charlottetown, Prince Edward Island
 CBF-FM-11 in Asbestos, Quebec
 CBM-FM-2 in Quebec City, Quebec
 CBRX-FM-2 in Sept-Iles, Quebec
 CFMY-FM in Medicine Hat, Alberta
 CFNR-FM-1 in Quesnel, British Columbia
 CFNR-FM-2 in Fort Nelson, British Columbia
 CFNR-FM-4 in Laxgalts'ap, British Columbia
 CFNR-FM-5 in Hartley Bay, British Columbia
 CFNR-FM-6 in Houston, British Columbia
 CHGG-FM in Limestone, Manitoba
 CHKG-FM in Vancouver, British Columbia
 CHMY-FM in Renfrew, Ontario
 CINB-FM in Saint John, New Brunswick
 CJEN-FM in Jenpeg, Manitoba
 CKIP-FM in Grand'Terre, Newfoundland and Labrador
 CKPX-FM in Kispiox, British Columbia
 CKRW-FM in Whitehorse, Yukon
 CKX-FM in Brandon, Manitoba
 VF2072 in Good Hope Indian Reserve, British Columbia
 VF2073 in Quesnel Reserve, British Columbia
 VF2077 in Moberly Lake, British Columbia
 VF2078 in Lower Post, British Columbia
 VF2079 in Masset Indian Reserve, British Columbia
 VF2110 in Blueberry River, British Columbia
 VF2111 in Burns Lake, British Columbia
 VF2112 in Doig River, British Columbia
 VF2113 in Fort Ware, British Columbia
 VF2114 in Iskut, British Columbia
 VF2115 in Kincolith, British Columbia
 VF2116 in Kitimat, British Columbia
 VF2118 in Kitwancool, British Columbia
 VF2120 in Telegraph Creek, British Columbia
 VF2133 in Atlin, British Columbia
 VF2162 in Halfway River, British Columbia
 VF2164 in Takla Landing, British Columbia
 VF2170 in Port Simpson, British Columbia
 VF2227 in Klemtu, British Columbia
 VF2228 in Nemaiah Valley, British Columbia
 VF2233 in Bella Coola, British Columbia
 VF2235 in Williams Lake, British Columbia
 VF2237 in Anahim Lake, British Columbia
 VF2238 in Redstone Flat Indian Reserve, British Columbia
 VF2271 in Aiyansh, British Columbia
 VF2272 in Alkali Lake, British Columbia
 VF2273 in McLeod Lake, British Columbia
 VF2276 in Dog Creek, British Columbia
 VF2279 in Ingenika, British Columbia

China 
 CNR Music Radio in Lhasa

Ireland
 Cork's 96FM (north County Cork)

Malaysia 
 988 FM in Kedah, Perlis & Penang
 Era in Kuching, Sarawak
 Suria in Kuantan, Pahang

Mexico
XEUN-FM in Mexico City
XHACA-FM in Acapulco, Guerrero
XHCCCA-FM in Los Mochis, Sinaloa
XHECS-FM in Manzanillo, Colima
XHEOH-FM in Ciudad Camargo, Chihuahua
XHEOO-FM in Tepic, Nayarit
XHESW-FM in Ciudad Madera, Chihuahua
XHEZAR-FM in Puebla, Puebla
XHGPE-FM in Guadalupe, Zacatecas
XHOB-FM in San Luis Potosí, San Luis Potosí
XHON-FM in Tampico, Tamaulipas
XHPLPM-FM in La Piedad, Michoacán
XHPPLY-FM in Playa del Carmen, Quintana Roo
XHPSJL-FM in San Juan de los Lagos, Jalisco
XHSANR-FM in San Rafael, Veracruz
XHSIBM-FM in Ixhuatlán De Madero, Veracruz
XHSIC-FM in Córdoba, Veracruz
XHTAM-FM in Ciudad Victoria, Tamaulipas
XHTGZ-FM in Tuxtla Gutiérrez, Chiapas
XHUAS-FM in Culiacán, Sinaloa
XHXC-FM in Taxco, Guerrero

Romania 

 Kiss FM (Romania) in Bucharest

Taiwan
Alian Radio in Miaoli and Chiayi

Trinidad & Tobago
WEFM (Trinidad and Tobago)

United States (Channel 241)
 KACR-LP in Alameda, California
 KAGG in Madisonville, Texas
  in Emporia, Kansas
 KBEX in Dalhart, Texas
 KBPT-LP in Bishop, California
 KBRP-LP in Bisbee, Arizona
 KBTQ in Harlingen, Texas
 KCDF-LP in Houston, Texas
 KCEL in Mojave, California
 KCTX-FM in Childress, Texas
  in Harrison, Arkansas
 KDOL-LP in Livingston, Texas
 KEXU-LP in Oakland, California
  in Perryton, Texas
  in Opportunity, Washington
  in Fountain, Colorado
 KICX-FM in Mccook, Nebraska
  in Crookston, Nebraska
 KIOX-FM in Edna, Texas
 KIRP-LP in Sugar Land, Texas
 KISO in Omaha, Nebraska
 KITO-FM in Vinita, Oklahoma
  in Watertown, South Dakota
 KJTZ-LP in Alameda, California
  in Worland, Wyoming
  in Kilgore, Texas
  in Shingletown, California
 KLKY in Stanfield, Oregon
  in Tucson, Arizona
 KLRQ in Clinton, Missouri
  in Odessa, Texas
  in El Dorado, Arkansas
  in Clinton, Iowa
 KNKR-LP in Hawi, Hawaii
  in Nome, Alaska
  in Madrid, Iowa
 KORQ in Winters, Texas
 KPEA-LP in San Francisco, California
 KPQN in Roswell, New Mexico
  in Crookston, Minnesota
  in Albert Lea, Minnesota
 KRQB in San Jacinto, California
 KRVE in Brusly, Louisiana
 KSLY in San Luis Obispo, California
  in Greeley, Colorado
  in Morgan Hill, California
  in Ontario, Oregon
  in Montrose, Colorado
 KTRU-LP in Houston, Texas
 KUIM in Bethel, Alaska
 KWFI-FM in Aberdeen, Idaho
 KWRK in Window Rock, Arizona
 KXJR in Chama, New Mexico
 KXXM in San Antonio, Texas
  in Olympia, Washington
  in Oklahoma City, Oklahoma
 KYDO in Campo, California
  in Lake Charles, Louisiana
  in Sacramento, California
 KYPZ in Fort Benton, Montana
 KYYZ in Williston, North Dakota
  in Eugene, Oregon
  in Bennington, Oklahoma
  in Maricao, Puerto Rico
 WBBB in Raleigh, North Carolina
 WBUB-LP in Portsmouth, New Hampshire
 WCBF in Elmira, New York
 WCFI-LP in Cuyahoga Falls, Ohio
 WCTO in Easton, Pennsylvania
  in Warren, Vermont
 WDKE (FM) in Coleraine, Minnesota
  in Jacksonville, Florida
  in Tallahassee, Florida
 WHNN in Bay City, Michigan
  in Shelby, North Carolina
 WIHW-LP in Dover, Delaware
  in Tunica, Mississippi
 WJMC-FM in Rice Lake, Wisconsin
 WJSY-LP in Newport, Vermont
 WJVC in Center Moriches, New York
  in Huron, Ohio
  in Barbourville, Kentucky
  in Pittsburgh, Pennsylvania
 WKWS in Charleston, West Virginia
  in Forestbrook, South Carolina
  in Lake Geneva, Wisconsin
 WLNT-LP in Loudon, Tennessee
  in Stamping Ground, Kentucky
  in Eupora, Mississippi
  in Holland, Michigan
 WMQR in Broadway, Virginia
  in Buffalo, New York
  in Archbold, Ohio
  in Rome, New York
 WOHK in Ashtabula, Ohio
  in Poughkeepsie, New York
 WQHR in Presque Isle, Maine
  in Montgomery, Alabama
  in Richmond, Indiana
  in Rantoul, Illinois
 WRKH in Mobile, Alabama
 WROJ-LP in St. Cloud, Minnesota
  in Exmore, Virginia
  in Bonita Springs, Florida
  in Red Lion, Pennsylvania
  in Worcester, Massachusetts
 WSTO in Owensboro, Kentucky
 WTCX in Ripon, Wisconsin
  in Dade City, Florida
  in Margate City, New Jersey
  in Norwood, New York
 WWID-LP in Orlando, Florida
 WWKS in Charlotte Amalie, Virgin Islands
 WWPW in Atlanta, Georgia
  in Florence, Alabama
  in Tomah, Wisconsin
 WZPP-LP in Hollywood, Florida

References

Lists of radio stations by frequency